State Route 324 (SR 324), also known as Sugar Limb Road, is a short state highway in Loudon County, Tennessee. It serves as one of two roads connecting the city of Loudon with Interstate 75 (I-75); the other is SR 72.

Route description

SR 324 begins at an interchange with I-75 at exit 76. It travels southeasterly through rural hilly terrain along the banks of the Tennessee River. The highway then enters the Loudon city limits and passes through industrial areas before coming to an end at an intersection with U.S. Route 11 (US 11, Lee Highway/SR 2) north of downtown. The entire route of SR 324 is a two-lane highway.

Major intersections

References

324
Transportation in Loudon County, Tennessee